The Samsung Galaxy A02 is a budget Android smartphone manufactured by Samsung Electronics as a part of its A series. The phone was announced and released in January 2021. It features a 6.5 inch 720p touchscreen display, a dual camera setup, and comes with One UI 2.5 over Android 10. It shares some of the same features of a similar device released by Samsung, the Samsung Galaxy M02.

Specifications

Hardware
The Samsung Galaxy A02 is equipped with a 6.5 in PLS TFT capacitive touchscreen with a resolution of 720 x 1600 (~270 ppi). The phone itself measures 164 x 75.9 x 9.1 mm (6.46 x 2.99 x 0.36 inches) and weighs 206 grams (7.27 oz), a bit heavier than another phone in the A02 lineup - Galaxy A02s. The A02 is constructed with a glass front and a plastic back and frame. This device is powered by the MediaTek MT6739W (28nm) SoC with a quad-core 1.5 GHz Cortex-A53 CPU and an PowerVR GE8100 GPU. The phone can have either 32 GB or 64 GB of internal storage as well as either 2 GB or 3 GB of RAM. Internal storage can be expanded via a Micro SD card up to 512GB. The phone also includes a 3.5mm headphone jack. It has a non-removable 5000mAh lithium-ion battery.

Camera
The Samsung Galaxy A02 has a dual-camera setup arranged vertically on the left side of the rear of the phone along with the flash. The main camera is a 13MP wide lens and the second is a 2MP depth sensor. The main camera can record video up at 1080p @ 30fps. A single 5MP front-facing camera is present in a notch.

Software
The Samsung Galaxy A02 comes with One UI Core 2.5 over Android 10, and upgradable to One UI Core 3.1 over Android 11.

See also 
 Samsung Galaxy A01
 Samsung Galaxy A02s
 Samsung Galaxy A01 Core
 Samsung Galaxy A series
 One UI

References 

Samsung Galaxy
Mobile phones introduced in 2021
Android (operating system) devices
Samsung smartphones
Mobile phones with multiple rear cameras